The MCM London Comic Con (formerly known as the London Movies, Comics, and Media Expo and London MCM Expo) is a speculative fiction fan convention held in the London Borough of Newham twice yearly since 2002, usually on the last weekend in May and October. The convention mainly focuses on video games, sci-fi, cosplay and popular media from the United Kingdom, United States, Japan, South Korea, France, Italy and elsewhere.

History and organisation
The London Movies, Comics, and Media Expo was founded in early 2001 by Paul Miley (ScifiShows) and Bryan Cooney (Wolf Events).

The convention is held twice each year, usually on the last full weekend of May and October. There have occasionally been exceptions to this, such as May 2009.

The event started as a single day and expanded to run across three days, attracting attendance and involvement of representatives from Universal Studios, Twentieth Century Fox, MVM Entertainment, Manga Entertainment, All the Anime, Marvel Comics, and NEO magazine.

The Movie Comic Media (MCM) Expo Group organises the London, Birmingham, the Midlands, Ireland, Northern Ireland, Belfast, Manchester, Scotland, Stockholm, Malmö, Copenhagen, Belgium, and Hannover MCM Comic Cons.  On 23 October 2017, ReedPop acquired MCM and all of its events throughout the UK.

Due to the COVID-19 pandemic, the October 2020 MCM London Comic Con was cancelled. However, it returned on 22-24 October 2021 with new safety measures in place.

Show features

Exhibit hall 
The MCM London Comic Con has a large floor-space for dealer stands and exhibitors which include media companies such as film studios and TV stations. There is also a theatre space that includes a large stage with projection monitors on either side and seating for approximately 1,000.

Guests 
Guests from popular media are commonly invited to the show. They take part for a variety of reasons. Often, this is to promote their latest product or production whether it be movie, TV or print. Sometimes it can be to raise awareness and funds for a charity or cause important to them. It is common to see television and film personalities selling autographs and interacting with their fans both in person and on stage during question and answer sessions. Along with panels, seminars and workshops with comic book professionals, there are previews of upcoming television and feature films, and portfolio review sessions with video game companies.

Autographs 
The event also includes an autograph area where big names in movies and TV sign items for the public.

Cosplay 
Ticket holders are allowed, and in many cases encouraged, to take part in cosplay. Cosplaying has become one of the most popular parts of the show. This can be to show off the costumer's latest work, to show devotion to their favourite characters or engage in role-play with other cosplayers in the same series, as well as to meet new people with mutual interests. The show also hosts the EuroCosplay championships which take place every October with one of the UK qualifying entries being decided at the May event.

Comic Village
Comic Village is an area of the show that is co-ordinated by Gary "Wheels" Howe, a member of the MCM Expo Group. This area has approximately 200 tables, where amateur as well as professional artists, writers and publishers sell their comics as well as prints. It also has a signing area where big names in the comic industry come and sign for members of the public. Previous guests include Gail Simone, Kevin Eastman, Frazer Irving and Antony Johnston.

MCM Fringe Festival 
In 2010, MCM Fringe Festival was re-vamped and given a new logo. The main purpose of Fringe is to allow cosplayers to organise photoshoots, meet-ups, picnics and get-togethers. Organisers are more easily able to create their own event within the Expo and broadcast it. At the same time, the rest of the Expo attenders can search the website and decide to go to it. Photoshoots will be more successful and likely to attract more people from the same anime or game to take part. Previous events have included picnics, dances and video gaming tournaments.

Eagle Awards for Comics 

The Eagle Awards were founded in 1977 and were the longest-running fan-voted awards for the comic industry. They were held at the MCM London Comic Con each May from 2010 until 2012, after which they were renamed the MCM Award in 2013. In the following year, 2014, the Eagle Award was presented under its new name — first The Stan Lee Eagle Award and then the True Believer Comic Awards — at the London Film and Comic Con. They have not been awarded since.

VidfestUK 
VidfestUK is an area of the expo dedicated to online visual media, such as animations, vlogs and various web series. Notable guests include YouTube partners such as TomSka and MrWeebl.

MyM magazine 
Now defunct MyM magazine does not have a presence at the event.

Location and dates

MCM BUZZ
MCM BUZZ is a website in association with MCM, bringing all the latest media-related news from movies, comics, interviews with celebrities and a live podcast.

See also
 List of multigenre conventions
 London Film and Comic Con
 Fandom

References

External links
 
 Official MCM Comic Con website
 Official MCM Expo Group website
 MyM on MCM Buzz
 event site website
 SyFy.co.uk - London MCM Expo Review 2009
 Forbidden Planet review & MCM Expo Pics and round up... 2010

Comics conventions
Multigenre conventions
British fan conventions
Recurring events established in 2002
Events in London